Benson High School is a public high school located in Benson, Minnesota. The school educates about 400 students in grades 6 to 12 in the Benson Public Schools District. Others schools in Benson include Northside Elementary School (PK-5).

Alumni
Henry G. Young, state legislator
Tiny Moving Parts - Rock band

References

External links 
Benson High School website

Educational institutions established in 1890
1890 establishments in Minnesota
Public high schools in Minnesota
Schools in Swift County, Minnesota
Benson, Minnesota